Olivia Martha Imalwa (born Ekandjo) is the Prosecutor General of Namibia since 2004.
 
Imalwa went into exile to Angola in 1982, studied and graduated with distinctions from United Nations Institute for Namibia in 1985 in Zambia. She went on to study LLB degree with honours in 1988 at the University of Warwick in the United Kingdom and returned to Namibia from exile in 1989. She served as co-ordinator for the Legal Assistance Centre after independence in March 1990 in Ongwediva before becoming a State Prosecutor in 1992 at Oshakati and subsequently serving as Control Prosecutor for the northern towns.

Martha Imalwa became State Advocate in the High Court of Namibia and was appointed as Deputy Prosecutor-General of Namibia in 2000 before being appointed in 2004 as Prosecutor-General of Namibia and was reappointed in the same position in 2013 by President Hifikepunye Pohamba.

References

Living people
Namibian lawyers
Members of SWAPO
Alumni of the University of Warwick
Year of birth missing (living people)